Florn was a German company which made small manual travel and desk alarm clocks. Most examples are “clam” or “oyster” compact styles for travel. The clocks were made beginning from at least 1936.

References

Clock brands